Sverre Lie (14 February 1926 – 7 September 1983) was a Norwegian tennis player.

Born in Nordstrand, Lie was an underground fighter in Norway's World War II resistance movement and helped bring weapons across the Swedish border. He is a relative of former UN Secretary-General Trygve Lie.

Lie was a fur importer by profession and on a 1948 business trip to New York City featured at the U.S. National Championships. In 1950 he reached the singles third round of the Wimbledon Championships.

A two-time national indoor singles champion, Lie played Davis Cup for Norway from 1951 to 1953.

References

External links
 
 
 

1926 births
1983 deaths
Norwegian male tennis players
Norwegian resistance members
Sportspeople from Oslo